Soyuz TM-34 was the fourth Soyuz mission to the International Space Station (ISS). Soyuz TM-34 was launched by a Soyuz-U launch vehicle.

Crew

Docking with ISS
Docked to ISS: April 27, 2002, 07:55 UTC (to nadir port of Zarya)
Undocked from ISS: November 9, 2002, 20:44 UTC (from nadir port of Zarya)

Mission highlights
This was the 17th crewed mission to ISS.

Soyuz TM-34 was a Russian Soyuz TM passenger transportation craft that was launched by a Soyuz-U rocket from Baikonur at 06:26 UT on 25 April 2002. It carried two cosmonauts and a South African tourist, Mark Shuttleworth, to the International Space Station (ISS). Shuttleworth performed some biology experiments, as he carried a live rat and sheep stem cells. All three returned on Soyuz TM-33 after an eight-day mission.

Soyuz TM-34 was the final flight of the Soyuz-TM variant, due to its replacement by the upgraded Soyuz-TMA. It was also the last crewed vehicle to launch atop the Soyuz-U rocket, although the Soyuz-U continued to launch uncrewed vehicles until 2017.

References 

Crewed Soyuz missions
Spacecraft launched in 2002
Orbital space tourism missions
Spacecraft which reentered in 2002
Spacecraft launched by Soyuz-U rockets